BioNews is an online newsletter publishing news on the science, law and ethics of human genetics, assisted conception, and related topics. It was founded in 1999 by Juliet Tizzard, and is published by the English charity Progress Educational Trust, of which it is the flagship publication.

It is published weekly, and has readers in 44 countries.

References

External links

Science websites
Newsletters
Internet properties established in 1999
English websites
1999 establishments in England
English-language websites
British news websites